Andrei Moțoc (born 13 April 2002) is a Moldovan professional footballer who plays as a defender for  club Siena, on loan from Salernitana.

Club career
Moțoc made his Serie C debut for Carpi on 3 March 2021, in a game against Legnago Salus.

On 1 September 2021, Moțoc joined Salernitana, and he made his Serie A debut with the club on 15 January 2022, in 3–0 home defeat against Lazio.

On 6 January 2023, Moțoc was sent on loan to Serie C side Siena until the end of the season, with option and counter-option to buy both included in the deal.

Career statistics

Club

References

External links
 

2002 births
Living people
Romanian people of Moldovan descent
Romanian footballers
Association football midfielders
Serie C players
Serie A players
A.C. Carpi players
U.S. Salernitana 1919 players
A.C.N. Siena 1904 players
Moldovan expatriate footballers
Moldovan expatriate sportspeople in Italy
Romanian expatriate footballers
Romanian expatriate sportspeople in Italy
Expatriate footballers in Italy